Dr. Jon D. Fuller, S.J., is a Jesuit priest, a medical doctor who works with AIDS patients, and a professor.

Education
Fuller studied at the University of California, San Diego School of Medicine and was graduated in 1983.

Medical career
Fuller is known for his work with HIV/AIDS patients. He did his residency at the San Francisco General Hospital in 1986. He was also a resident with the Boston Visiting Nurse Association in 1993. He is board certified in family practice. He was the founding president of the National Catholic AIDS Network.  He is assistant director of the Adult AIDS Program at Boston Medical Center.

Teaching career
Fuller teaches at Harvard Divinity School, the Boston University School of Medicine, and is the first Margaret E. Pyne Professor of Pastoral Studies at Weston Jesuit School of Theology.

References

20th-century American Jesuits
21st-century American Jesuits
HIV/AIDS researchers
University of California, San Diego School of Medicine alumni
Harvard Divinity School faculty
Weston Jesuit School of Theology faculty
Boston University faculty